The University of Oxford is a collegiate research university located in Oxford, England, founded .

Oxford University may also refer to:

 Oxford University (UK Parliament constituency), university constituency to the British House of Commons from 1603 to 1950

See also
 Oxford Brookes University, a public university in Oxford, England
 Oxford College of Emory University, an American two-year residential college in Oxford, Georgia
 Oxford College (disambiguation)
 Oxford High School (disambiguation)
 Oxford Academy (disambiguation)
 Oxford University College (disambiguation)